Hesel is a municipality in Leer district.

Hesel is also the seat of the Samtgemeinde ("collective municipality") Hesel.

References

Towns and villages in East Frisia
Leer (district)